The women's 200 metre freestyle event at the 2014 Pan Pacific Swimming Championships took place on 21 August at the Gold Coast Aquatic Centre in Gold Coast, Australia.

Records
Prior to this competition, the existing world and championship records were:

The following records were established during the competition:

Results

Heats

B Final

A Final

References

External links

Women's 200 metre freestyle
Pan Pacific Swimming Championships
2014 in women's swimming